Forever Summer: Hamptons is an American reality television series. It premiered on Amazon Prime Video on July 15, 2022.

Summary
The coming-of-age docusoap follows a group of college-aged friends from different socio-economic backgrounds, who spend their summer working at a seaside restaurant in the Hamptons by day, and partying in town by night.

Cast 
 Avery Solomon
 Ilan Luttway
 Emelye Ender 
 Frankie Hammer
 Juliet Clarke
 Hunter Hulse
 Lottie Evans
 Habtamu "Habs" Coulter
 Shannon Sloane
 Milo Munshin
 Sophia Messa
 Reid Rubio

Production
On May 4, 2022, Amazon Studios announced they had greenlit the series, for a July release. The series was filmed in the East Quogue and Westhampton Beach areas of the Hamptons in New York. It is produced by Haymaker East (producers of Bravo's Southern Charm) and Amazon Studios, and executive produced by Lynne Spillman, Aaron Rothman, Josh Halpert, Jesse Light, Jessica Chesler and Morgan Miller.

The cast includes Avery Solomon, Ilan Luttway, Emelye Ender, Frankie Hammer, Juliet Clarke, Hunter Hulse, Lottie Evans, Habtamu "Habs" Coulter, Shannon Sloane, Milo Munshin, Sophia Messa, and Reid Rubio.

Release
The official trailer was released on June 27, 2022. All 8 episodes of the series premiered on Prime Video on July 15, 2022.

References

External links
 

2022 American television series debuts
2020s American reality television series
American dating and relationship reality television series
English-language television shows
Amazon Prime Video original programming
Television series by Amazon Studios
Television shows filmed in New York (state)
The Hamptons, New York